The 12th Goya Awards were presented in Madrid, Spain on 31 January 1998. The gala was hosted by El Gran Wyoming.

Lucky Star won the award for Best Film.

Winners and nominees
The nominees and winners are listed as follows:

Major award nominees

Other award nominees

Honorary Goya
 Rafael Azcona

References

12
1997 film awards
1997 in Spanish cinema